The 1961–62 Alpha Ethniki was the 26th season of the highest football league of Greece. The season began on 9 September 1961 and ended on 1 July 1962 with the play-off matches. Panathinaikos won their third consecutive and sixth Greek title.

The point system was: Win: 3 points - Draw: 2 points - Loss: 1 point.

League table

Results

Top scorers

External links
Hellenic Football Federation 
Rec.Sport.Soccer Statistics Foundation

Alpha Ethniki seasons
Greece
1961–62 in Greek football leagues